{{DISPLAYTITLE:C8H17NO3}}
The molecular formula C8H17NO3 may refer to:

 Desosamine
 Statine

Molecular formulas